Mick Ranger is a British firearms dealer. He founded IDSC (International Defence Security Company) and has been involved with several large arms deals with several countries.

Biography
Born in 1947, Ranger runs Imperial Defence Services, which is based in Takeley, Essex.  His firm has operations in Bulgaria, Cyprus, Nigeria, Australia, South Africa and Vietnam.  The company website states:

The website does not quote prices, although it is claimed that it previously stated the company sold grenade-launchers for £450, and a collection of rifles from £195 to a £20,000 General Electric Minigun.

Disputed dealings
In 2003, The Guardian published a report suggesting that Ranger was willing to sell arms to an undercover reporter posing as an agent wanting arms for a peace-keeping operation near the Iraqi border in Syria.  The reporter made it clear that the weapons might be used in Iraq, but Ranger had no qualms with selling the weapons. Ranger made it clear he was aware of UN arms restrictions and told the undercover reporter that, "he would not agree to any deal where Iraq was mentioned in official documents,"  and that the end user certificate would require, "conclusive wording... that the guns being supplied will stay in Syria and will only be used by people so authorised by the Syrian government."

Hungerford massacre

The Hungerford massacre occurred in Hungerford, Berkshire, England, on Wednesday 19 August 1987. A 27-year-old unemployed local labourer, Michael Robert Ryan, armed with several licensed weapons, including a semi-automatic Chinese Type 56 rifle, shot and killed 16 people. The Chinese Type 56  had been legally sold to Ryan by Ranger, who was the sole UK importer of the weapon, dealing directly with the manufacturer, Norinco.

Prison sentence

Ranger was sentenced in July 2012 to three-and-a-half years imprisonment for setting up a deal to sell missiles and handguns from North Korea to Azerbaijan. There is a ban on exporting arms to Azerbaijan that has been in place since 1992.

References

External links
Imperial Defence Services

1987 in England
Living people
1947 births
People from Takeley
Arms traders
English businesspeople
British businesspeople in the armaments industry